Stephen Stanley is an American politician, who has served in the Maine House of Representatives since 2012. He represents the 143rd district as a member of the Maine Democratic Party.

He previously served in the House of Representatives from 1996 to 2002, and in the Maine Senate from 2002 to 2004.

References

External links

1952 births
20th-century American politicians
21st-century American politicians
Democratic Party members of the Maine House of Representatives
Democratic Party Maine state senators
People from Millinocket, Maine
Living people